Manchester Historic District may refer to:

Manchester Historic District (Manchester, Connecticut), listed on the NRHP in Hartford County, Connecticut
Manchester College Historic District, North Manchester, Indiana, listed on the NRHP in Wabash County, Indiana
North Manchester Historic District, North Manchester, Indiana, listed on the NRHP in Wabash County, Indiana
Manchester Village Historic District (Manchester, Massachusetts), NRHP-listed
Manchester Historic District (Pittsburgh, Pennsylvania), NRHP-listed
Manchester Village Historic District (Manchester, Vermont), NRHP-listed
Manchester Industrial Historic District, Richmond, Virginia, listed on the NRHP in Richmond, Virginia
Manchester Residential and Commercial Historic District, Richmond, Virginia, listed on the NRHP in Richmond, Virginia

See also
Maplewood Commercial Historic District at Manchester and Sutton, Maplewood, Missouri, listed on the NRHP in St. Louis County, Missouri